Nirmal Jiban Ghosh (5 January 1916 – 26 October 1934) was an Indian revolutionary and member of the Bengal Volunteers. He was hanged on 26 October 1934 for the charge of assassination of Magistrate Burge.

Family 
Ghosh was born in Dhamasin village, Hooghly district in 1916. His father name was Jamini Jibon Ghosh. He was admitted in I.A. in Midnapore College and joined the Bengal Volunteers, a revolutionary organisation of British India. His family was attached with the Indian freedom movement. His brother Prof. Binoy Jibon Ghosh was dismissed from service for having a connection with the Swadeshi movement. Another brother Naba Jibon Ghosh committed suicide while imprisoned by the British. His elder brother Jyoti Jibon Ghosh was also imprisoned.

Revolutionary activities 
After the murder of Magistrate Paddy and Robert Douglas no British officer was ready to take the charge of Midnapore. Mr. Bernard E J Burge,  a ruthless District Magistrate was posted in Midnapore district. The members of the Bengal volunteers i.e. Ramkrishna Roy, Brajakishore Chakraborty,Prabhanshu Sekhar Pal, Kamakhya Charan Ghosh, Sonatan Roy, Nanda Dulal Singh, Sukumar Sen Gupta, Bijoy Krishna Ghose, Purnananda Sanyal, Manindra Nath Choudhury, Saroj Ranjan Das Kanungo, Santi Gopal Sen, Sailesh Chandra Ghose, Anath Bondhu Panja and Mrigendra Dutta etc. decided to assassinate him. Ghosh along with Anath Bondhu Panja and Mrigen Dutt shot him dead while Burge was playing a football match ( Bradley-Birt football tournament) named by Francis Bradley Bradley-Birtat the police grounds of Midnaporeon 2 September 1933. Special Tribunal under B.C.L.A. Act, 1925 found them guilty and sentenced to death.

Death 
Ghosh was hanged in Medinipur Central Jail on 26 October 1934. Brajakishore and Ramkrishna were sentenced to death in 25 October.

References

1916 births
1934 deaths
Executed revolutionaries
Revolutionary movement for Indian independence
Indian nationalism
Indian people convicted of murder
Indian revolutionaries
Executed Indian people
20th-century executions by the United Kingdom
People executed by British India by hanging
People from Hooghly district
Indian independence activists from West Bengal
Revolutionaries from West Bengal
Revolutionaries of Bengal during British Rule